Q55 may refer to:
 Q55 (New York City bus)
 Ar-Rahman, the 55rd surah of the Quran